Ashton is a village and civil parish about ¾ mile east of Oundle in the east of the English county of Northamptonshire forming part of the unitary authority of North Northamptonshire. The population of the civil parish at the 2011 census was 219.

History
The villages name means 'ash-tree farm/settlement'.

Ashton was re-built in 1900 by the Rothschild family for estate workers. Since 1965 it has hosted the World Conker Championship traditionally on the second Sunday of October. This is now held in Southwick.

The village is the birthplace of Dame Miriam Rothschild a noted natural scientist and author.

In 1952 George and Lillian Peach were murdered at their home in the village. The crime remains Northamptonshire's oldest unsolved murder case.

Notable buildings
Ashton Wold was built in 1900 for the Honourable Charles Rothschild (d. 1923, suicide). The architect was William Huckvale and the house is in the Tudor style.

Many of the cottages in the village date from 1900–01 and were designed by Huckvale. Two more cottages were added in 1945 in the same style; Pevsner refers to Ashton as a model village. The cottages are Tudor style and thatched. Almost all of the buildings the village are Grade II or II* listed.

The Creed Chapel and adjacent school building date from 1705, the manor house from the 15th century.

References

External links

Listed Buildings in Ashton, Northamptonshire, England from British Listed Buildings website
A short history of Ashton and the Rothschild Family from the Estate website
Details of the World Conker Championship organised by Ashton Conker Club
A short history of the village and the pub from the Chequered Skipper website
 
The Parish Church of Oundle with Ashton

Villages in Northamptonshire
Civil parishes in Northamptonshire
North Northamptonshire